Shartym (Şartım) is a rural locality (a village) in Safarovsky Selsoviet, Uchalinsky District, Bashkortostan, Russia. The population was 59 as of 2010. There is 1 street.

Geography 
Shartym is located 27 km northeast of Uchaly (the district's administrative centre) by road. Ilyinka is the nearest rural locality.

References 

Rural localities in Uchalinsky District